This is a list of Gladiators UK events featured in the UK version of Gladiators.

Original series events 
The following events appeared during the original eight-year run of the UK series of Gladiators. In total there were 24 televised events with the Eliminator being the only event to appear in every episode.

The event line-up changed from series to series, with new events being added every series, however over the years some events were dropped for safety reasons, and some never made it onto screen.

Atlaspheres 
 First appearance: series 1, 1992 – heat 1
 Last appearance: series 8,  1999 – "Battle of the Giants"

The first event ever shown on Gladiators in 1992. The two contenders and two Gladiators were enclosed in large spherical cages that they had to propel from within. The contenders' task was to roll the spheres onto any of four scoring pods. When a pod was activated, a plume of smoke was emitted and the contender scored 3 points. They were given 60 seconds to score as many points as they could in this fashion, whilst the Gladiators had to block the contenders from scoring. It was crucial that the contenders get the atlasphere into the dead-centre of a pod in order to score. This round holds the record for most objections where video replays demonstrated the referees had made the correct decision.

The event's signature tune was "We Will Rock You" by Queen. The event was sometimes modified for celebrity specials, in which either two Gladiators faced three contenders, or three Gladiators faced three contenders from a standing start. From series 7 onwards, 2 contenders faced 3 Gladiators

Contenders were not allowed to score on the same pod twice unless they had already scored on another since the last visit. Gladiators were not allowed to double-team a contender and could only keep them confined for ten seconds.

Catapult 
 First appearance: series 7, 1998 – heat 4
 Last appearance: series 7, 1998 – quarter final 3

Two contenders faced two Gladiators. Each competitor was attached to a bungee cord and on the whistle they began to bounce up and down. The contenders scored 2 points by throwing balls into octagonal goals situated behind the Gladiators, whilst the Gladiators attempted to stop the contenders from scoring by blocking the goals. Each game lasted 60 seconds.

This event had heavy modification to its gameplay between its initial concept and first outing, with the 1998 programme mentioning a volleyball-style net situated between contenders and Gladiators. It was modified into the event that made it onto screen as this was deemed more exciting.

Danger Zone 
 First appearance: series 1, 1992 – heat 1
 Last appearance: series 7, 1998 – quarter final 3

Contenders, one at a time, made their way across the arena whilst dodging tennis balls fired at high speed by a Gladiator. Between the start and finish were stations where the contender was shielded from the Gladiator's fire, and where they could attempt, using a projectile weapon, to hit a target above the Gladiator. Each of the stations self-destructed at ten-second intervals and their weapons were rendered unusable (a difference from the US version, named Assault, which did not have a limit). Successful shots on the target ended the game, earning the contender 10 points. However, contestants could still earn 5 points by reaching the end of the course without being hit and touching a second, lower target. Reaching the end originally scored 10 points in series 1, and was reduced to 5 points in series 2 onwards. If the contender did not hit the target above the Gladiator, they were awarded 1 bonus point for each weapon fired. If the contender was hit directly by a tennis ball (ricochets off the floor, station or weapon did not count), they were eliminated.

Dogfight 
 First appearance: series 7, 1998 – heat 1
 Last appearance: series 7, 1998 – semi-final 2

Contender and Gladiator were each strapped into an airship suspended 30 feet above the arena floor. The aim was to hit the glowing chest plate on their opponent using a combat club. Two successful hits resulted in the loser being automatically released from their harness onto the safety net below. Each hit was registered by a pyro explosion. One hit from the contender earned 5 points, while sending the Gladiator flying within the 30-second time limit earned them 10. Decisions were frequently reviewed as the equipment did not always register direct hits. The event's signature tune was "Up in a Puff of Smoke" by Polly Brown.

Duel 
 First appearance: series 1, 1992 – heat 1
 Last appearance: series 10, 2009 – “The Legends Last Stand”

A contender and a Gladiator were each placed atop an elevated platform a short distance apart. Armed with a pugil stick (often referred to as a giant cotton bud), they attempted to cause the other to fall from their platform within the 30-second time limit. This could be achieved with either an offensive or a defensive strategy, although some contenders were disqualified if they made no attacking move towards the Gladiator. If either competitor touched their opponent, their opponent's pugil stick or platform with anything other than the padded ends of their own pugil stick, this led to an automatic loss. Losing a pugil stick also resulted in an automatic loss. Contenders scored 10 points for knocking the Gladiator off or 5 points for remaining on their platform for the duration.

The event returned in the revival series with the same rules and scoring system, but now played above water rather than crash mats.

The event was known as Joust in the US series.

Gauntlet 
 First appearance: series 2, 1993 – heat 6
 Last appearance: series 10, 2009 – final

A contender had to "run the gauntlet" by passing Gladiators armed with ramrods. Originally played with three Gladiators, Gauntlet became one of the staple events after a revamp in series 3 in which the contenders had to run a narrower gauntlet against five Gladiators, the second and fourth having power pads to slow the contenders down. Contenders were forbidden from crawling or grappling with the Gladiators or their equipment.

In series 2, contenders scored 3 points for each zone completed, plus one bonus point for the fastest time. From the quarter-finals onward, they scored 10 points for the fastest time and 5 for second fastest. From series 3 to 6, 10 points were awarded for finishing in under 20 seconds and 5 points for under 30 seconds. In series 7 and 8, contenders scored 10 points for finishing, otherwise 1 point for each sector completed. In series 9 and 10, contenders scored 2 points for each Gladiator passed, plus a bonus 2 for breaking the wall of bricks at the end.

Gladiators could only interact with the contender if they were in their designated zone, and had to cease the instant the contender had reached the white line marking the edge of that territory.  Gladiators were also forbidden from holding and pinning the contenders, or from pushing them out of the gauntlet (in contrast to the American series, where this was allowed and would result in the contender losing the event).

Gauntlet returned in the revival series, with stricter penalties for ducking and crawling under Gladiators, resulting in disqualification. The contenders were also further hindered by protective packs they were required to wear to house camera equipment. In the heats, contenders faced four Gladiators, but from the quarter-finals onwards, this was increased to five and a new unnamed weapon was featured.

Hang Tough 
 First appearance: series 1, 1992 – heat 1
 Last appearance: series 10, 2009 – “Battle of the Athletes”

Contender and Gladiator began on opposite sides of the arena, on raised platforms. Between them hung a grid of suspended rings, similar to gymnastic rings. The contender's objective was to reach the Gladiator's platform within 60 seconds by swinging between the rings, scoring 10 points if successful. The Gladiator meanwhile, swinging in the opposite direction, would attempt to prevent the contender from completing this task, usually by causing the contender to fall from the rings. Contenders were not allowed to try and make a Gladiator fall, or use their feet to impede the Gladiator. If the Gladiator fell, they were not allowed to interfere with the contender again. A contender still scored five points if they were holding unto a red ring within the scoring zone when the time limit expired. Contenders and Gladiators were not allowed to use either headlocks or tickling against each other, even though the latter happened frequently for comedic reasons. The event's signature tune was "Hey Rock n Roll" by Showaddywaddy. If a contender gets eliminated, "Tubthumping" by Chumbawamba is played in the background.

Hang Tough returned in the revived series with the same rules and scoring system, but now played above water rather than crash mats.

Hit & Run 
 First appearance: series 3, 1994 – heat 5
 Last appearance: series 10, 2009 – “The Legends Last Stand”

Originally known as Cannonball Run in its road test at the Wembley live shows, the contender had 30 seconds to run back and forth across a suspension bridge, scoring two points for each crossing. Four Gladiators (two on each side of the bridge) attempted to knock the contender off by launching four-foot demolition balls at them. Contenders were forbidden from crawling or moving backwards. The event's signature music was "Hey Rock n Roll" by Showaddywaddy.

Hit & Run returned in the revived series. The bridge was suspended above water and the contender had to touch a buzzer located on each platform. In series 10, contenders had a limited time after hitting each button to get to the other side. The time limit was eight seconds for female contenders and seven for male contenders. If the contender did not hit the button in time, a light went out and the crossing did not score any points. Contenders were also liable to be disqualified if they did not keep running at all times.

Joust 
 First appearance: series 2, 1993 – heat 2
 Last appearance: series 4, 1995 – quarter final 1

A variation on Duel (which is known as Joust in the US series) in which contender and Gladiator were sat on sky bikes that twisted, bucked and spun like a rocking rodeo. Both participants had combat clubs with which they attempted to knock each other off. In the Wembley live shows, the bikes were large and only a few feet off the ground and contestants fought using pugil sticks. For the televised series, the bikes were made smaller, were further off the ground and combat clubs used. Contenders scored 10 points for knocking the Gladiator off or 5 points for remaining on the sky bike for the full 30 seconds.

A significant majority of games ended in a time limit draw and this event was quickly phased out, making very few appearances before being axed after the 1995 series. It wasn't a popular event with fans. Many calling for it to be axed from its debut in series 2.

Pendulum 
 First appearance: series 4, 1995 – heat 2
 Last appearance: series 7, 1998 – final

The pendulum was a ball 5 metres in diameter, which hung from the ceiling of the arena, 40 feet (12.23 m) above the ground. The event was contender versus Gladiator in a game of hide and seek and tag. On the whistle, the pendulum would begin to swing from side to side to the tune of "O Fortuna". The aim of the contender was to avoid the Gladiator, whose objective was to track the contender down and remove the Velcro tag from their back. Once this was done, the game was over. If the contender or Gladiator fell off, the remaining participant won. Contenders scored 10 points for remaining on the Pendulum for 60 seconds or 5 points for staying on for 40 seconds. If the contender was judged to be actively blocking the Gladiator from removing their tag, rather than trying to evade the Gladiator, the event was stopped. Both participants were forbidden from climbing above the red orbs at the top of the sphere, although this was largely for safety reasons as this took them into the swinging mechanism. In 1998, the rules were changed: the contender's objective was to hit 4 lit sectors in different positions around the pendulum, while still avoiding being caught by the Gladiator. Contenders could score 2 points for each of three upper sectors hit and 4 points for lower sector (for a maximum of 10 points).

Pendulum was originally planned to debut in the Sheffield live 1995 shows, but had to be dropped as the safety net was too big to fit in the arena. Instead, Joust was played.

Pole-Axe 
 First appearance: series 3, 1994 – heat 8
 Last appearance: series 7, 1998 – semi-final 1

A contender and Gladiator each climbed a  pole fitted with helically-arranged pegs. The first to the top pressed a button which retracted the pegs on the opponent's pole, causing them to fall to the crash mat below. If the contender beat the Gladiator, they would score 10 points. If the contender fell off at any point, they lost. There was also a rule that determined that if the Gladiator fell off before the contender had reached their button, the contender must still reach their button in order to score any points. This rule never came into play as the Gladiators never fell off by mistake.

This event was removed in 1996 because of injuries to Gladiators and contenders. It was revived in 1997 with safety harnesses to stop the "freefall" aspect. This also meant a run up to mount the pole and a higher climb.

Powerball 
 First appearance: series 2, 1993 – heat 1
 Last appearance: series 10, 2009 – “Battle of the Athletes”

This cross between basketball and rugby in which 2 contenders faced 3 Gladiators on the Powerball pitch. Contenders had 60 seconds to place balls in the five scoring baskets on the pitch (2 points for a score in one of the four outer baskets and 3 points for the middle) whilst the Gladiators had to tackle the contenders, preventing them from scoring (though head-high tackles and similar moves were illegal for safety reasons and would result in the Gladiator being disqualified). A Gladiator could not touch a contender until they had stepped into the indicated zone on the mat. If any part of the contender or the ball touched the floor, the ball become invalid and could not be used to score. Before continuing, the contender was required to get a ball from the other container. If a Gladiator deliberately moved a scoring basket or blocked the opening, the affected player would be awarded the lost points after the game. This event became one of the most played events during Gladiators. From 1998 onwards, the rules were changed: there were only two Gladiators and each one targeted a specific contender. In series 9 and 10, the centre basket was worth 5 points.

The signature tune for the female Gladiators was "We Are Family" by Sister Sledge and later "Sisters Are Doin' It for Themselves" by Eurythmics. The song used for the male Gladiators was "The Boys Are Back in Town" by Thin Lizzy and later "Let's Get Ready to Rhumble" by PJ & Duncan. "Bad Boys" by Inner Circle was used when Wolf and Vulcan played together.

Pursuit 
 First appearance: series 3, 1994 – heat 7
 Last appearance: series 10, 2009 – semi-final 2

Two contenders raced against each other over an obstacle course, chased by two Gladiators. The course comprised a snake beam, wire bridge, hand ladder, two web traps, a high and low wall and a sprint finish. The course was rearranged for series 4 onwards and the rules were tightened up with penalty points being introduced for stepping off the beam or missing rungs on the hand ladder. Gladiators could catch the contenders by removing a tag from their back before the contender reached the finish line. Gladiators were expected to run the obstacles in exactly the same way that the contenders did. If they tagged a contender without doing this, the Gladiator would be disqualified and the contender awarded five points. Contenders scored 10 points for finishing the course first, 5 points for finishing second.

Pyramid 
 First appearance: series 3, 1994 – heat 2
 Last appearance: series 10, 2009

Two contenders would race up a giant black-and-white pyramid. Both contenders would have a Gladiator assigned to them who would try to prevent them from reaching the summit. The Gladiator was not permitted to touch the contender until they had passed the second step. While the contenders started on different sides of the pyramid, they were not required to stay on their own side. The contenders aimed to reach the summit, whilst the Gladiators aimed to stop them. This event was axed in 1996 after Jet was badly injured in a live show, causing her retirement from Gladiators.

It was reintroduced in series 6 with smaller steps and a red step which, once reached, the contender has free run to the top. However, it was unpopular with viewers as it lacked the excitement of the original and consequently it was axed again. The event returned in series 9 and 10.

There was a unique version of this game created for a children's special. Before reaching the button on the summit, teams had to remove large pieces of fruit from their side of the pyramid. Team members had to take turns at completing the task, with only one team member being allowed on the pyramid at any time. The team members could only move the first piece of fruit they had touched during that turn. Instead of being impeded by a Gladiator, the Gladiator encouraged the team from the sidelines.

Skytrak 
 First appearance: series 2, 1993 – heat 1
 Last appearance: series 7, 1998 – heat 7

Two contenders and two Gladiators were suspended 40 feet in the air on the Skytrak course – an upside down Scalextric-style figure of eight. Contenders had a 10-yard head start over the Gladiators.  Each contender had a trailing detonator button behind them, and was caught if the Gladiator pressed this button. Should this happen, a small shower of sparks was released from the contender's vest. Contenders scored 10 points for finishing first and 5 points for finishing second, but no points if caught by the Gladiator.

Sumo Ball 
 First appearance: series 5, 1996 – Northern heat 2
 Last appearance: series 7, 1998 – quarter final 3

The only new game for series 5 and first road-tested in the 1996 live shows, the contender and Gladiator were positioned on a circular platform in which a large red sumo ball hung from the ceiling. Both participants had 30 seconds to push the opponent off the platform using the 75kg ball. Both participants were required to hold unto a rope on the ball. Releasing this rope could result in an automatic loss. Contenders scored 10 points if they pushed the Gladiator off the platform or 5 points for remaining on the platform for the full 30 seconds.

Suspension Bridge 
 First appearance: series 2, 1993 – heat 1
 Last appearance: series 10, 2009

An adaption of the Duel event in which the contender must cross a suspension bridge. They were armed with a hammerhead, and were impeded by a Gladiator with the same. The contender was not required to knock the Gladiator off the bridge, and was not rewarded for doing so. If the Gladiator fell, the round continued until the contender had reached the Gladiator's platform or the time limit had expired. The time limit in series 2 and 3 was 60 seconds, and was reduced to 30 seconds from series 4 to 7. Contenders scored 10 points for reaching the opposite platform and 5 points for remaining on the bridge until the end of the time limit. In series 10, the contender would score points for knocking the Gladiator off the bridge.

Swingshot 
 First appearance: series 1, 1992 – heat 1
 Last appearance: series 8, 2000 – final

In this event, contestants started on a platform suspended above the arena and were harnessed onto bungee ropes. Suspended above the arena was a column with coloured balls affixed to it, the lowest balls were yellow (worth 1 point each), the middle balls blue (2 points) and the higher balls red (3 points). The objective of the game was for the contenders to jump from their platform to the floor, bouncing up to the suspended column and grabbing balls to place in a basket atop their platform. Gladiators were positioned on opposite platforms and would time their jumps to block the contenders. Balls only counted if the contender successfully placed them in their basket before the 60 second time limit had expired, and any ball that had touched the arena floor could not be used to score points.

The Eliminator 
 First appearance: series 1, 1992 – heat 1
 Last appearance: series 10, 2009 – “The Legends Last Stand”

The final event, and the only event seen in every episode; this was a contender against contender obstacle course. The first contender to complete the Eliminator course would win the episode and progress to the next round. Unlike in the American version, the Gladiators would have no involvement with this round. Points gathered throughout the episode were used to determine a head start. For every point the contender with the higher score was ahead, 0.5 seconds would be added to their head start. Once a winner was determined, the runner-up was encouraged to finish the course anyway.

Each obstacle on the course had rules which were only explained to viewers if there was a potential violation, and if the referee was not satisfied that the contender crossed an obstacle properly, he could demand that they retake it. 

The first obstacle was originally a cargo net with a steel slide and a scramble sheet. In series 2 this was replaced by high-and-low beams and a rope climb. The high-and-low beams were a set of four hurdles to scale; the high hurdles needing to be scaled while the low ones needed to be rolled under. In series 5, a new obstacle was placed between the high-and-low beams and the rope climb, called the bungee maze which required contestants to climb through a series of elastic ropes. In series 6 this was replaced by a double-sided cargo net with a trampoline at its base; both sides needed to be scaled to pass. The second low hurdle was removed from the course to make room. 

After the scramble sheet/rope climb, contenders would cross from one platform to another; the females on a hand ladder while males used a hand bike. They then crossed to a third platform by running across rolling beams, which were replaced by trapezes in series 6. After this, contenders would climb a vertical cargo net up to a gantry, where they would take a zip line down to a crash mat on the arena floor. Following this, they traversed a balance beam, which was introduced in series 2. During series 6, the single balance beam was replaced with two seesaws. Each had a teeter-totter mechanism; the contenders needed to negotiate the obstacle without falling off and had to make certain their feet touched a yellow mark at the end of each seesaw, though this was only a rule during the heats as from the quarter-finals onwards, the yellow mark was not included on the seesaws. 

The final obstacle was the travelator, which was an incline into which two belts running in the opposite direction of the incline were installed. The object was to scale the ramp while running against the belts. When attempting the travelator, contenders were not allowed to use the covers on either side of the moving belt to help them get up. Once atop the travelator, contenders then grabbed a rope and used it to burst through a paper barrier to finish. When it was unclear which contender won, producers would watch a replay to determine who had torn the paper wall at the end first. 

A new version was created for the Sky 1 series, and incorporated an underwater swim in the pool at the beginning. This feature caused contenders to become fatigued sooner, and being wet made some obstacles harder to overcome. As a result, the travelator would sometimes need to be slowed down or even stopped to help the contender finish the course. The order of obstacles in the rebooted series was as follows: underwater swim, cargo net, cotton reel (series 9 only), fireman's rope (series 9 only), floor travelator (series 10 only), monkey bars (women)/hand bike (men), balance beam, pyramid, zipline and travelator.

The Wall 
 First appearance: series 1, 1992 – heat 1
 Last appearance: series 10, 2009 – “Battle of the Athletes”

Contenders attempted to climb up a 36ft climbing wall covered with hand and foot holds while the Gladiators gave chase, and attempted to pull them off.

In the first series, the female contenders received a 20-second head-start, falling to 15 seconds in the semi-finals and final; while the men received a 15-second head-start falling to 10 seconds in the semi-finals and final. In later series, the head-starts were standardised at 10 seconds for female contenders and 7 seconds for the male contenders.

In series 1 and 2, contenders received 10 points for reaching the top of The Wall, from series 3 to 8 this was changed to 10 points for reaching the top first and 5 points for reaching the top second. In series 9 and 10, contenders could also score 5 points if they remained on The Wall at the end of the 60-second time limit. 

If the contender fell off The Wall before the Gladiator was released, they were allowed to try again. However, if the contender fell after the Gladiator started climbing, it would be a loss. The Gladiator was allowed as many tries as necessary. A win was only counted if the contender got their entire body over the wall within the time limit. Contenders were not allowed to try and remove the Gladiators or their opponents from the wall. Gladiators were forbidden from touching the contenders' harness equipment or necks.

Tightrope 
 First appearance: series 6, 1997 – heat 1
 Last appearance: series 7, 1998 – final

The only new event of series 6, a one-on-one race. The contender and Gladiator were harnessed up on the Tightrope 30 feet above the arena floor. On the whistle they raced up the rope to the halfway platform. Once there they hit a button to activate a zip Line, then hook up to this and slide back down to hit the impact cushion at the end, therefore winning the event and sending their opponent flying as their zip line disconnected in a shower of sparks. The contender would score 10 points for beating the Gladiator in the race.

Tilt 
 First appearance: series 2, 1993 – heat 1
 Last appearance: series 4, 1995 – heat 8

An tug-of-war in which both contender and Gladiator were on tilting platforms. The contender was placed on a lower platform and the Gladiator on a higher platform. Because of the height difference in platforms, Gladiators were able to use their platform to their advantage to make the task harder for the contender. Two 30-second bouts were played, and contenders would score 5 points for pulling the Gladiator off, or 2 points for remaining on their platform until the end of the time limit.

This event proved unpopular with the Gladiators due to the risk of injury. The tilting of the platforms often caused competitors to fall awkwardly. If either competitor released the rope or fell off a platform, the sudden loss of tension would cause their opponent to fall unexpectedly. Due to the higher height of the Gladiator's platforms, they were at greater risk of injury. After both Panther and Nightshade suffered serious injuries because of this event, it was axed after series 4. Tilt became the basis for the American Gladiators event Tug-O-War, which was safer due to the platforms being at the same height with each other.

Vertigo 
 First appearance: series 7, 1998 – heat 1
 Last appearance: series 7, 1998 – final

Vertigo was a one-on-one race between contender and Gladiator across five 27-foot (8.3m) poles. On the whistle the competitors climbed the first pole to the top. Once at the top, they swung their pole and used momentum to transfer across to the next pole along. They had to complete a left-to-right swing before transferring. They proceeded along all five poles until the end where a suspended silver ring awaited, the first to grab this won the event in a shower of sparks. Contenders scored 10 points for reaching the end ring first, otherwise 1 point for each pole reached.

Whiplash 
 First appearance: series 4, 1995 – heat 1
 Last appearance: series 8,  1999 – "Battle of the Giants"

A tug-of-war game in which contender and Gladiator grip a "dog bone" and the contender had to use this to pull the Gladiator out of the ring or to obtain the "dog bone". No wrenching or pulling was permitted on the Gladiator's part, their role was strictly defence, however, the contender could use any means to remove the Gladiator. The "dog bone" was changed in later seasons and was designed to keep both contender and Gladiator from letting go and making for more exciting bouts. Contenders would score 10 points for pulling the Gladiator out of the ring within the 30-second time limit.

Unused events 
Two events were planned, even appearing in the opening titles, but never made it to any televised series.

Breakthrough & Conquer 
This two-part event (based on the event of the same name in the American series) was road-tested in the 1993 Wembley live shows, but it was never played in any televised series (although clips of it were shown in the series 2 opening show).

For the first part of the event, the contender, armed with a rugby ball, had to get past a Gladiator without being tackled, gaining 5 points if successful. Any foul by a Gladiator (illegal strike to the head, not in the five-yard zone, etc.) also was an automatic win. For the second part, the contender was placed in a small circle against a different Gladiator and had 30 seconds to remove the Gladiator from the circle, again receiving 5 points should they be successful.

Cyclotron 
This event was due to appear as a new event in the 1997 series along with Tightrope, even appearing (as a CGI image) in the opening credits.

Gameplay appeared to involve both contender and Gladiator on cycles on a rotating circular track. It appeared that the Gladiator was to chase the contender with the aim of catching them. The reason for Cyclotron's removal from the events roster is unknown, although it is rumoured that it was due to technical problems and certain Gladiators commented on it being too difficult to play and very hard for the audience to follow.

Sky 1 series events 
These events were added in the revival of the series in 2008.

Earthquake
 First appearance: series 9, 2008 – heat 2
 Last appearance: series 10, 2009 – “The Legends Last Stand”

The contender and Gladiator were situated on a circular platform suspended above crash mats, which is free to tilt slightly. The contender and Gladiator attempted to throw each other off the platform. If the contender threw the Gladiator off, they scored 10 points, and could score 5 points for remaining on the platform at the end of the 30 second time limit. 

When the event was first shown, several warnings were issued by the referee to both contenders and Gladiators for wrestling, not allowing the other to get up after being pushed down on the platform, and for holding onto the supporting wires. In one episode, the referee stated that competitors were only allowed to push against their rival's arms, but this rule was never enforced beyond that occasion. The event continued to be plagued by stop-start calls due to vague interpretations of the rules. In series 10 the platform was higher up in the studio and the fall was onto a net instead of crashmats. The prohibition on wrestling was removed, as it was leading to too many interruptions.

Rocketball
 First appearance: series 10, 2009 – heat 1
 Last appearance: series 10, 2009 – “The Legends Last Stand”

Contenders and Gladiators were attached to harnesses and pushed buttons to be launched into the air, where contenders attempted to throw balls into a lower white basket (worth 1 point each) or upper yellow basket (worth 2 points). The Gladiators attempted to block the goals. 

Gladiators (1992 British TV series)
Gladiators UK